Richland Township is one of sixteen townships in Franklin County, Iowa, United States.  As of the 2010 census, its population was 219 and it contained 99 housing units.

History
Richland Township was organized in 1872.

Geography

Cemeteries
The township contains Old Chapin Cemetery, Shobes Grove Cemetery and Zion Reformed Cemetery.

Transportation
 Interstate 35

School districts
 Cal Community School District
 Hampton-Dumont Community School District
 West Fork Community School District

Political districts
 Iowa's 4th congressional district
 State House District 54
 State Senate District 27

References

External links
 City-Data.com

Townships in Iowa
Townships in Franklin County, Iowa
1872 establishments in Iowa